National Tertiary Route 507, or just Route 507 (or ) is a National Road Route of Costa Rica, located in the Heredia, Limón provinces.

Description
In Heredia province the route covers Sarapiquí canton (Puerto Viejo, Llanuras del Gaspar districts).

In Limón province the route covers Pococí canton (Colorado district).

References

Highways in Costa Rica